"Odysseus' Scar" is the first chapter of Mimesis: The Representation of Reality in Western Literature, a collection of essays by German-Jewish philologist Erich Auerbach charting the development of representations of reality in literature. This first chapter examines the differences between two types of writing about reality embodied by Homer's Odyssey and the Old Testament.  In the essay, Auerbach introduces his anti-rhetorical position, a position developed further in the companion essay "Fortunata" (ch. 2) which compares the Roman tradition of Tacitus and Petronius with the New Testament, as anathema to a true representation of everyday life.  Auerbach proceeds with this comparative approach until the triumph of Flaubert, Balzac and "modern realism" (ch. 18).

"Two Basic Types" 
According to Auerbach, the Old Testament and the Odyssey are “in their opposition ... basic types” of ancient epic literature.  While the Old Testament can be various and arbitrary, multilayered in its characterization of people and events, the Odyssey is the epitome of detailed, organized and logical storytelling informed by the rhetorical tradition.

Although he acknowledged that both works exercised an enormous influence over subsequent Western literature, Auerbach held that the true motivation behind the representations of reality in both the Bible and the Odyssey lay within and without aesthetic considerations.  For Homer, it lay in the rhetorical tradition of the poet to "represent phenomena in a fully externalized form, visible and palpable in all their parts."  For the Elohist writer, on the other hand, it was belief in a religion, and the desire—not rhetorical considerations like the Greek and Latin tradition of the "two styles" (high for noble histories and low for comedic portrayals of the lower classes)—to convey the truth of that reality.  Furthermore, the two works were written for very different purposes; the Odyssey, as a piece of entertainment to "make us forget our own reality for a few hours," while the Bible, as religious doctrine, to "make us fit our own life into its world."

Content 
In the essay, Auerbach begins with a close reading of brief excerpts from Homer in which, upon Odysseus’ homecoming, his old nursemaid Euryclea recognizes the hero by the scar on his thigh.  Auerbach notes here the clarity and orderliness of Homer's verse, as well as the tidy comparative, causal, and temporal relationships articulated by Homer's precise syntactical constructions, all hallmarks of the rhetorical tradition.  As an example, he points out how, with the careful insertion of a flashback "retarding element" (a term he credits to Goethe and Schiller) into the middle of the story, Homer creates a relaxing excursion to defer suspense.  By keeping the focus always on the present narrative, the "procession of phenomena," Homer presents always remains illuminated in the foreground, even as the story itself jumps back and forth between times and locations.

In contrast, Auerbach's reading of Abraham's sacrifice in the Book of Genesis reveals a style of realism that is "fraught with background" and full of mystery and omissions.  Unlike Homer's  style, in which everything is clarified, the Elohist leaves unsaid any detail that does not pertain to the story's purpose. Conversely, what is said is always loaded with meaning, creating an effect of accumulating suspense.  Auerbach contrasts this with the rhetorical style of the Odyssey, one in which "even when the most terrible things are occurring ... details prevent the reader from concentrating exclusively on a present crisis."

In the second half of the essay, Auerbach switches to a point-by-point comparison of the two works:

 The tyranny of truth: Truth has no bearing on the relevance of Homer's stories, because the stories are "realistic" enough to be self-sufficient in their own conception of reality.  On the other hand, the Bible has everything to do with its perceived relation to truth.  The "realism" represented by the Bible is the direct consequence of this adherence to the "tyranny" of truth.

Looking at it from another point of view, the Odyssey is a narrative very limited in the scope because of the limitations imposed by rhetoric on the ways to represent reality, whereas the Bible's "tyrannical" claim on all truth from Creation to the Last Days, results, ironically, in an authentic representation of human experience. For this reason,  Auerbach believes the traditional allegorical or "figurative" interpretations of the Bible lose all sense of the book's "earthy" portrayals.

Ultimately, by the time Auerbach treats his chapter on Flaubert the work comes full circle. Like the Biblical writers whose faith in the so-called "tyrannical" truth of God produces an authentic expression of reality, Flaubert's "faith in the truth of language" (ch. 18) likewise represents "an entire human experience."

 Representation of heroes:  The Odyssey'''s heroes seem to change very little both inwardly and outwardly, even under duress, because they represent rhetorical "types."  Like "Achilles' actions by his courage and his pride, and Odysseus' by his versatility and foresightedness," they can be always summed up with a few apt epithets.  On the other hand, characters of the Bible (such as Jacob and Job) are irrevocably changed by the trials they undergo.
 History versus legend:  The Odyssey is told like a legend—it is a little too convenient, too streamlined a story, and its characters are all "clearly outlined" men with "few and simple motives."  In the Bible, reality is represented more like history—filled with ambiguity, confusion, and contradictory motives.

 Criticism 

Several common critical objections to Auerbach's essay have been that the passages he chose for close reading were not sufficiently representative of the two texts.  Some scholars maintain, instead, that the poetry (rather than the prose) of the Old Testament would be more appropriate for comparison to Homer's verse.

Unsurprisingly, much of the criticism of this essay has come from classicists, many of them finding Auerbach's reading of the Odyssey overly simplistic.  Another argument is that Auerbach failed to take into account that the Odyssey may have been the written record of an orally told work, and that therefore the reality it represents is not the story of Odysseus, but rather the telling of the story of Odysseus.  Such an interpretation would perhaps partly account for the work's thoroughly articulated and backgroundless style.

Although Auerbach explicitly states in his essay that he chose the particular texts of the Odyssey and the Old Testament because of their subsequent influence on Western literature, some scholars have questioned whether he may also have had political motivations for writing a piece comparing a sacred Jewish text to the Odyssey, perhaps by using it as an analogy for the conflict between Judeo-Christian tradition and the Aryan Nazism flourishing in Europe at the time of Mimesis’ writing. On the other hand, some of Auerbach's descriptions of the Biblical style, such as "tyrannical", seem to better fit Nazism than its Jewish victims, a fact which would undermine such an analogy were Auerbach trying to make one.

 Further reading 
Ankersmit, Frank R.  "Why Realism?  Auerbach and the Representation of Reality." Poetics Today, Vol. 20, No. 1. (Spring, 1999), pp. 53–75. 
Bakker, Egbert J.  "Mimesis as Performance: Rereading Auerbach's First Chapter" Poetics Today, Vol. 20, No. 1  (Spring, 1999), pp. 11–26
Bloom, Harold.  Homer.  New York:  Chelsea House Publications
Breslin, Charles.  "Philosophy or Philology: Auerbach and Aesthetic Historicism" Journal of the History of Ideas > Vol. 22, No. 3 (Jul., 1961), pp. 369–381
Damrosch, David "Auerbach in Exile" Comparative Literature  Vol. 47, No. 2  (Spring, 1995), pp. 97–117
Fleischmann, Wolfgang Bernard.  "Erich Auerbach's Critical Theory and Practice:  An Assessment" MLN, Vol. 81, No. 5, General Issue. (Dec., 1966), pp. 535–541.
Green, Geoffrey. Literary Criticism and the Structures of History: Erich Auerbach and Leo Spitzer.  Lincoln, Nebraska:  University of Nebraska Press, 1983.
Landauer, Carl.  "Mimesis" and Erich Auerbach's Self-Mythologizing"  German Studies Review > Vol. 11, No. 1 (Feb., 1988), pp. 83–96
Lerer, Seth.  Literary history and the challenge of philology : the legacy of Erich Auerbach.  Stanford, CA: Stanford University Press, 1996.
Porter, James I. "Erich Auerbach and the Judaizing of Philology." Critical Inquiry Vol. 35, No. 1 (Autumn 2008), pp. 115–47.
Whallom, William.  "Old Testament Poetry and Homeric Epic."  Comparative Literature  Vol. 18, No. 2  (Spring, 1966), pp. 113–131

External links
 "Odysseus' Scar", Willard R. Trask's translation from the 1953 first edition of Mimesis''

1946 essays
Homeric scholarship